Saltstraumen is a small strait with one of the strongest tidal currents in the world. It is located in the municipality of Bodø in Nordland county, Norway. The narrow channel connects the outer Saltfjorden to the large Skjerstad Fjord between the islands of Straumøya and Knaplundsøya. The Saltstraumen Bridge on Norwegian County Road 17 crosses Saltstraumen.

Current
Saltstraumen has one of the strongest tidal currents in the world. At this point, one source claims that the tidal current can reach . 

Saltstraumen has existed for about two to three thousand years. Before that, the area was different due to post-glacial rebound. The current is created when the tide tries to fill Skjerstad Fjord. When the current turns, there is a period when the strait is navigable.
 The above account of the Saltstraumen is rather different than what The Norwegian Pilot reports. The Pilot’s description of the normal current is based on the time of the high tide at Bodø. The speed of this current also has a broad maximum being above six knots from two hours and forty minutes after Bodø high tide until five and a half hours before the next Bodø high tide. The behavior of the current may differ from normal due to strong winds or when more fresh water than usual is entering into the fjord from the surrounding mountains.

Fishing
Saltstraumen is popular with anglers, due to its abundance of fish such as saithe, cod, wolffish, rose fish, and halibut. Coalfish is a specialty of the area.

Eiders are the only birds capable of diving for mussels in the strong stream.

Name
The first element is the name of the district Salten and the last element is the definite form of straum, meaning "stream" or "water flow".

History
The remains of a 10,000-year-old hunter settlement in the area are the oldest known traces of human settlement in Bodø, and also one of the oldest archaeological discoveries in Norway. These hunters lived on the edge of the ice, attracted by the abundance of fish caused by the strong currents.

Media gallery

See also
Maelstrom
Tidal bore
Skookumchuck Narrows
Horizontal Falls, where the tide creates a  water fall with a drop of 5 metres,  as the water flows at the maximum rate.

References

External links

Local Norwegian site with details about the current, in English
Visit Norway's guide to Saltstraumen
The complete text of Edgar Allan Poe's A Descent into the Maelstrom 

Whirlpools
Landforms of Nordland
Bodies of water of Norway
Bodø
Tourist attractions in Nordland
Straits of Norway
Articles containing video clips